Queen Victoria Street, named after the British monarch who reigned from 1837 to 1901, is a street in London which runs east by north from its junction with New Bridge Street and Victoria Embankment in the Castle Baynard ward of the City of London, along a section that divides the wards of Queenhithe and Bread Street, then lastly through the middle of Cordwainer ward, until it reaches Mansion House Street at Bank junction. Beyond Bank junction, the street continues north-east as Threadneedle Street which joins Bishopsgate. Other streets linked to Queen Victoria Street include Puddle Dock, Cannon Street, Walbrook and Poultry.

The road was commissioned in 1861 to streamline the approach to the central business district, and was provided for through the Metropolitan Improvement Act. Costing over £1,000,000, it remains a major street within the City. It was built over Old and New Pye Streets, named for Sir Robert Pye.

The nearest London Underground stations are Blackfriars (at its western junction with New Bridge Street), Mansion House (where it crosses Cannon Street), and Bank (near its eastern end).

Queen Victoria Street formed part of the marathon course of the 2012 Olympic and Paralympic Games.

Notable buildings 

 The Bank of New Zealand's triangular building at No. 1 was their London office from 1889 to 1988. It is now the offices of the City of London Magistrates' Court Committee
 Bloomberg London at No. 3
 The Salvation Army's global headquarters at No. 101
 City of London School at No. 107
 A Monetary Authority of Singapore branch at No. 128
 The College of Arms' headquarters at No. 130
 Baynard House at No. 133
 St Benet Paul's Wharf church, at No. 135
 The Faraday Building at No. 136-144. A blue plaque marks the previous site of the Doctors' Commons, demolished in 1867. 
 The British and Foreign Bible Society was formerly located at No. 146 from 1868 and 1985. That address is now occupied by the Church of Scientology of London
 The church of St. Andrew-by-the-Wardrobe
 The Bank of New York Mellon at No. 160, formerly the site of The Times newspaper offices

References

External links

Google Maps

Streets in the City of London